Secrets of the Heart is a 1997 Spanish film. The film was a Box Office hit in Spain grossing ESP 711,092,434. It was nominated for the Academy Award for Best Foreign Language Film at the 70th Academy Awards.

Plot
During the holidays, Javi and his older brother Juan go to a mountain village. There Javi is attracted by a secret, concealed in the closed room where his father died. The child's curiosity will be satisfied and will lead him to a surprising discovery.

Cast
 Carmelo Gómez as Tío
 Charo López as María
 Sílvia Munt as Madre
 Vicky Peña as Rosa
 Andoni Erburu as Javi
 Álvaro Nagore as Juan Zabalza
 Íñigo Garcés as Carlos
 Joan Vallès as Abuelo
 Joan Dalmau as Benito
 Chete Lera as Ricardo
 Manolo Monje as Don Bautista
 José María Asín as Don Alejandro
 Carlos Salaberri as Bedel

Commentaries
According to the film's producer, Secretos del corazón is "a poetical and emotional movie that can share with Hollywood's big overproductions' special effects."

Armendáriz has had a brief film career and appears in such works as "Historias del Kronen", "Tasio" and "Las cartas de Alou".

Awards

Goya Awards

Cartagena Film Festival

Berlin International Film Festival

Academy Awards

Sant Jordi Awards

Ondas Awards

Chicago International Film Festival

Spanish Actors Union

Cinema Writers Circle Awards

See also
 List of submissions to the 70th Academy Awards for Best Foreign Language Film
 List of Spanish submissions for the Academy Award for Best Foreign Language Film

References

External links
 Secrets of the Heart (1997) Rotten Tomatoes
 Secrets of the Heart (1997) IMDb
 Secrets Of The Heart (DVD) (2000) Amazon.co.uk

1997 films
1997 drama films
Spanish drama films
1990s Spanish-language films
Films directed by Montxo Armendáriz
Films about children
Films shot in Madrid
1990s Spanish films